Events from the year 1525 in art.

Events
 Albrecht Dürer publishes his work on geometry, The Four Books on Measurement ("Underweysung der Messung mit dem Zirckel und Richtscheyt" or "Instructions for Measuring with Compass and Ruler") at Nuremberg
 Lucas Horenbout is named royal "pictor maker" to King Henry VIII of England, and will introduce the techniques of portrait miniatures to England
 Jan Cornelisz Vermeyen is named Court Painter to Archduchess Margaret of Austria

Works

Painting

 Lucas Cranach the Elder
 Cardinal Albert of Brandenburg before Christ on the Cross (approximate date)
 Venus and Cupid
 Antonio da Correggio – Venus with Mercury and Cupid or The School of Love (approximate date)
 Michelangelo – Head of Bearded Man Shouting
 Pontormo – Youth in a Pink Cloak Jan Provoost – Last Judgment (Groeningemuseum)
 Nicola da Urbino – Panel with the Adoration of the Magi Bernard van Orley – The Last Judgment (triptych, commissioned for Antwerp)
 Bartolomeo Veneto – Flora (approximate date)
 Pseudo Jan Wellens de Cock – The Crucifixion (triptych, approximate date)

Sculpture
 Conrad Meit – Judith with the head of Holofernes (alabaster)

Armor
 Kolman Helmschmid – Portions of a Costume Armor (Metropolitan Museum of Art)

Birthsdate unknownCesare Baglioni, Italian painter specializing in quadratura (died 1590)
Pieter Balten, Flemish Renaissance painter (died 1584)
Ferrando Bertelli, Italian engraver of the Renaissance period (died unknown)
René Boyvin, French engraver who lived in Angers (died 1598)
Pieter Bruegel the Elder, Netherlandish Renaissance painter and printmaker known for his landscapes and peasant scenes (died 1569)
Ascanio Condivi, Italian painter and writer, primarily remembered as the biographer of Michelangelo (died 1574)
Cristofano dell'Altissimo, Italian painter primarily working in Florence (died 1605)
Guillaume Le Bé, French engraver (died 1598)
Giulio Mazzoni, Italian painter and stuccoist (died 1618)
Francesco Terzi, Italian painter of primarily religious themes (died 1600)
Giovanni Maria Verdizotti, Venetian artist and poet (died 1600)
Juan Valverde de Amusco, Italian anatomist and engraver (died 1587)
Francisco Venegas, Spanish painter active in Portugal (died 1594)
Alessandro Vittoria, Italian Mannerist sculptor of the Venetian school (died 1608)
Song Xu, Chinese landscape painter (died unknown)
 1525/1530: Hans Collaert, Flemish engraver (died 1580)

Deaths
January 24 - Franciabigio, Italian painter of the Florentine Renaissance (born 1482)
June - Girolamo di Benvenuto, Italian painter, son of Benvenuto di Giovanni (born 1470)
June 10 - Tosa Mitsunobu, Japanese painter and founder of the Tosa school of painting (born 1434)
August 4 - Andrea della Robbia, Italian Renaissance sculptor, especially in ceramics (born 1435)date unknownBernardino Bergognone - Italian Renaissance painter of the Milanese school (born 1455)
Boccaccio Boccaccino, Italian painter of the Emilian school (born 1467)
Vittore Carpaccio, Italian painter of the Venetian school (born 1460)
Nunziata d'Antonio, Italian painter, fireworks artist, and bombardier (born 1468)
Attavante degli Attavanti, Italian miniature painter (born 1452)
Ortolano Ferrarese, Italian painter of the Ferrara School (born 1480 or 1490)
Davide Ghirlandaio, Italian painter and mosaicist (born 1452)
Michael Sittow, painter from modern Estonia who was trained in the tradition of Early Netherlandish painting (born 1469)
Sōami, Japanese painter and landscape artist (b. unknown'')
Jacob van Utrecht, Flemish early Renaissance painter (born 1479)

 
Years of the 16th century in art